Omega Township may refer to the following townships in the United States:

 Omega Township, Carroll County, Arkansas
 Omega Township, Marion County, Illinois
 Omega Township, O'Brien County, Iowa